Julio Alberto González Hormiga (born 30 March 1985 in Santa Cruz de Tenerife, Canary Island) is a Spanish retired footballer who played as a midfielder.

External links

1985 births
Living people
Spanish footballers
Footballers from Santa Cruz de Tenerife
Association football midfielders
CD Tenerife B players
CD Tenerife players
Spain youth international footballers